Vanhornia eucnemidarum is a species of wasp in the family Vanhorniidae.

References

Parasitic wasps
Articles created by Qbugbot
Proctotrupoidea